Maithil Brahmins are a Hindu Brahmin community from the Mithila region of the Indian subcontinent that comprises Tirhut, Madhubani, Darbhanga, Kosi, Purnia, Munger, Bhagalpur of Bihar; Bokaro in Jharkhand and Santhal Pargana divisions of India and some adjoining districts of Nepal.
They are one of the five Pancha-Gauda Brahmin communities.
The main language spoken by Maithil Brahmins is Maithili.

History
Some of the dynastic families of the Mithila region, such as the Karnat dynasty (Nepal), Oiniwar Dynasty (India) and Khandwal Dynasty (India) (Raj Darbhanga), were Maithil Brahmins and were noted for their patronage of Maithil culture.

In the 1960s and 1970s, the Maithil Brahmins became politically significant in Nepal and Bihar. Durgananda Jha, Parmananda Jha, Binodanand Jha and Lalit Narayan Mishra emerged as prominent political leaders of the community. Under the Chief Ministry of Jagannath Mishra, many Maithil Brahmins assumed important political positions in Bihar.

Divisions
According to the Vedic Samhita, Maithil Brahmins are divided into the Vajasaneyi(Yajurvedic) and the Chandogya(Samavedic) and each group is strictly exogamous. They are also further classified by four main categories, the Srotriyas(Soit), the Yogyas(Bhalmanush), the Painjas and the Jaiwars. They are all expected to be morganatic(anuloma) however these days this is no longer enforced strictly. They are also divided into various Mools or Clan's name. And every mool is further divided into upamool or sub clans. It is similar like garh and goti of Baiga tribe, Graamam and Griham of Nambudiri Brahmins, yek salai of Meitei People and Hala and Mukun of Jurchen People. They have many Aaspad or Surnames like Jha, Rai, Mishra, Sharma, Thakur, Vats, Choudhary, Pathak, Kunwar, Singh etc.

Religious practices
They are mainly practitioners of Shaktism in various forms, however there are also Vaishnavites and Shaivites.

Panjis
Panjis or Panji Prabandh are extensive genealogical records maintained among Maithil Brahmins similar to the Hindu genealogy registers at Haridwar. They are used mainly when fixing marriages and delineate the last 7 generations of the bride and grooms family.

See also
 Gotra
 List of Notable Maithil Brahmins

Notes

References

External links
 

Brahmin communities across India
Brahmin communities of Bihar